Udobny (masculine), Udobnaya (feminine), or Udobnoye (neuter) may refer to:

Udobny, Republic of Adygea, a settlement in the Republic of Adygea, Russia
Udobnaya, a village in Krasnodar Krai, Russia
Udobnoye, a village in Kursk Oblast, Russia